Gila Deborah Gladstone-Martow  ( Gladstone; born June 5, 1961) is a politician in Ontario, Canada. She has represented Ward 5 on Vaughan City Council since 2022. She previously represented the electoral district of Thornhill in the Legislative Assembly of Ontario as a member of the Ontario Progressive Conservative Party from 2014 to 2022. Martow did not seek re-election in the 2022 Ontario general election after unsuccessfully seeking the federal Conservative nomination in 2021. Martow returned to municipal politics in her successful election bid in the 2022 Vaughan Municipal Election.

Background
Originally from Chomedey, Quebec, Martow was an optometrist. She and her husband, an ophthalmologist, jointly ran an eye clinic at the Markham Stouffville Hospital.

Martow's maternal grandparents lived on a kibbutz organized by the Hashomer Hatzair Marxist-Zionist youth movement in the early 1930s in Mandatory Palestine (later to become Israel). Martow attended the socialist movement's summer camp, Camp Shomria, from 1973 to 1977. The camp's Mia Gladstone Art Program is named in memory of Martow's mother.

Political activism
In 2007, she was a spokesperson for the Multi-Faith Coalition. During the provincial election that year, she supported Progressive Conservative leader John Tory's plan to create funding among Ontario’s private faith-based schools. She said, "By not funding non-Catholic faith-based schools, there is going to be social unrest. This is discrimination against non-Catholics."

Ontario legislature
In early 2014, she ran in a by-election in the riding of Thornhill to replace the retiring Peter Shurman. She defeated Liberal candidate Sandra Yeung Racco on February 13, 2014. Four months later she ran again in the 2014 provincial election. She faced Racco again in a rematch. Initially Racco was declared the winner but the decision was reversed the next day following the official Elections Ontario tally of the vote. Martow was declared the winner by 85 votes. A recount was done and Martow was declared the winner on June 23, 2014 by a margin of 106 votes.

On December 1, 2016, Martow presented a motion in the legislature rejecting the Boycott, Divestment and Sanctions campaign against Israel. It passed by a vote of 49-5 with the governing Liberals, and PCs supporting, and NDP opposing.

In the past, Martow has served as the PC Critic for Intergovernmental Affairs (2014) and as the Anti-Racism Secretariat (2016).  She then served in the shadow cabinet as the critic for:  Children, Youth, and Families;  GTA Issues;  and Francophone Affairs until 2018.

After the Progressive Conservatives formed government following the 2018 provincial election, Martow was appointed Parliamentary Assistant to Labour Minister Laurie Scott by Premier Doug Ford. On November 29, 2018, Premier Ford announced that Martow would become the Parliamentary Assistant to the Minister of Francophone Affairs, Caroline Mulroney and that Jane McKenna would take over her position as the Parliamentary Assistant to the Minister of Labour.

In January 2021, she attracted controversy after breaking a COVID-19 lockdown to visit her cottage over Christmas.

Failed federal nomination bid and departure 
In early 2021, Martow ran unsuccessfully for the federal Conservative nomination in Thornhill, where she was defeated by Melissa Lantsman. As a result of announcing her candidacy for the federal nomination, she was required to relinquish her Parliamentary Assistant role in the provincial legislature and was not permitted to run in the 2022 Ontario general election as a Progressive Conservative candidate.

Municipal politics
Martow announced her candidacy for Vaughan City Council in Ward 5 on May 4, 2022 for the 2022 municipal election. Martow previously ran for the same ward in the 2010 municipal election, losing to incumbent Alan Shefman. After Shefman defeated Gila Martow's supported candidates in 2014 (Josh Martow, her son) and 2018 (Allan Goldstein), Martow eventually defeated Shefman in a 2022 rematch by 1,104 votes (7,142 - 6,341).

Election results

Municipal

{| class="wikitable"
|-
|Colspan="2" align="center"|2010 Vaughan election, Ward 5 
|-
! bgcolor="#DDDDFF" width="150px" | Candidate
! bgcolor="#DDDDFF"  | Votes
|-
| Alan Shefman (x) || 5,561
|-
|Gila Martow || 4,279
|-
|Bernie Green || 2,898
|-
|Vernon Hendrickson || 1,870
|-
|Yehuda Shahaf || 694
|-
|Stellios  Missirlis || 231

Provincial

		

		

| style="text-align:left;" colspan="2"|Progressive Conservative hold  
|align="right"|Swing
|align="right"|  +0.34% 
|

References

External links
 

1961 births
Anglophone Quebec people
Jewish Canadian politicians
Living people
Canadian optometrists
Politicians from Montreal
Progressive Conservative Party of Ontario MPPs
Women MPPs in Ontario
21st-century Canadian politicians
21st-century Canadian women politicians
Jewish women politicians
Ontario municipal councillors